Benjamin Cornwell Dawkins Sr. (July 19, 1881 – August 22, 1966) was a United States district judge of the United States District Court for the Western District of Louisiana.

Education and career
Born in Ouachita City, an unincorporated community in Union Parish, Louisiana, Dawkins received a Bachelor of Laws from Tulane University Law School in 1906 and entered private practice in Monroe, Louisiana until 1912. From 1912 to 1918, he was a Judge of the Louisiana District Court. In 1918, he became an associate justice of the Supreme Court of Louisiana, a position that he held until 1924.

Federal judicial service
Dawkins was nominated by President Calvin Coolidge on April 25, 1924, to a seat on the United States District Court for the Western District of Louisiana vacated by Judge George W. Jack. He was confirmed by the United States Senate on May 5, 1924, and received his commission the same day. He served as Chief Judge from 1948 to 1953. He assumed senior status on May 17, 1953, and was succeeded by his son, Judge Benjamin C. Dawkins Jr. His service terminated on August 22, 1966, due to his death.

References

Sources
 

1881 births
1966 deaths
Justices of the Louisiana Supreme Court
Judges of the United States District Court for the Western District of Louisiana
United States district court judges appointed by Calvin Coolidge
20th-century American judges
Tulane University alumni
Tulane University Law School alumni
Place of death missing
People from Union Parish, Louisiana